Martín Sebastián Aguirre (born 16 January 1981) is a former Argentine football central midfielder. He is currently the assistant manager of Club Atlético Tigre.

Coaching career

Tigre
On 18 December 2017, Aguirre was appointed as the assistant coach of Cristian Raúl Ledesma at Club Atlético Tigre.

References

External links
 Argentine Primera statistics at Fútbol XXI  
 Statistics at BDFA 

1981 births
Living people
Sportspeople from Bahía Blanca
Association football midfielders
Argentine footballers
Villa Mitre footballers
Godoy Cruz Antonio Tomba footballers
Olimpo footballers
Club Atlético River Plate footballers
Bella Vista de Bahía Blanca footballers